East Licking Creek is a  tributary of Tuscarora Creek in central Pennsylvania in the United States.

See also
List of rivers of Pennsylvania

References

Rivers of Pennsylvania
Tributaries of the Juniata River
Rivers of Juniata County, Pennsylvania